This is a list of episodes for The Jay Leno Show airing from September 14, 2009, to February 9, 2010.

2009

September

October

November

December

2010

January

February

References

External links
 
 Lineups at Interbridge 

Lists of variety television series episodes
Lists of American non-fiction television series episodes